Phoetaliotes is a genus of spur-throated grasshoppers in the family Acrididae. There is at least one described species in Phoetaliotes, P. nebrascensis.

References

Further reading

External links

 

Melanoplinae
Articles created by Qbugbot